Paul Callistus Sereno (born October 11, 1957) is a professor of paleontology at the University of Chicago and a National Geographic "explorer-in-residence" who has discovered several new dinosaur species on several continents, including at sites in Inner Mongolia, Argentina, Morocco and Niger.  One of his most widely publicized discoveries is that of a nearly complete specimen of Sarcosuchus imperator — popularly known as SuperCroc — at Gadoufaoua in the Tenere desert of Niger.

Biography

Youth and education
The son of a mail carrier and an art teacher at Prairie Elementary, Sereno grew up in Naperville, Illinois and graduated from Naperville Central High School. He was then educated at Northern Illinois University (B.S., Biological Sciences, 1979) and Columbia University (M.A., Vertebrate Paleontology, 1981; M. Phil., Geological Sciences, 1981; Ph.D., Geological Sciences, 1987).

Career

Sereno was named one of People magazine's 50 Most Beautiful People (1997).

Sereno co-founded Project Exploration, a non-profit science education organization to encourage city kids to pursue careers in science. He appears in the 2009 DVD Dinosaur Discoveries, featuring classic segments of CBS anchorman Walter Cronkite as the host, which aired on A&E in 1991. It was later re-shown on the Disney Channel until the late 1990s.

On August 14, 2008, it was revealed that Sereno had uncovered a large Stone Age cemetery at Gobero in the Nigerien Sahara, remnants of a people who lived from 10,000 to 5,000 years ago on the edge of what was then a large lake. The National Geographic documentary, Skeletons of the Sahara was made about this discovery and premiered in 2013.

Fossil species described by Sereno or his team

Dinosaurs
Aerosteon
Afrovenator 
Significant new material of Carcharodontosaurus, including Carcharodontosaurus iguidensis)
Deltadromeus
Eocarcharia
Eodromaeus
Eoraptor
Erliansaurus
Graciliceratops
Significant new material of Herrerasaurus
Jobaria
Kryptops
Neimongosaurus
Nigersaurus
Pegomastax
Three new species of Psittacosaurus (P. meileyingensis, P. xinjiangensis, P. gobiensis) 
Rajasaurus
Raptorex
Rugops
Significant new material of Spinosaurus
Significant new material of Sinornithomimus.
Spinostropheus
Suchomimus

Other fossil reptiles
Marasuchus, an early relative of dinosaurs
"The African Pterosaur"
Sarcosuchus imperator or SuperCroc
Anatosuchus minor or DuckCroc from Niger
Araripesuchus rattoides or RatCroc from Niger and Morocco
Kaprosuchus saharicus or BoarCroc from Niger and Morocco
Laganosuchus thaumastos or PancakeCroc from Niger and Morocco
Laganosuchus maghrebensis or PancakeCroc from Niger and Morocco

Documentaries featuring Sereno and his discoveries
In addition to his many discoveries in the field, public communication has been a big part of Sereno's career.

References

External links
 Paulsereno.org: official Paul Sereno website
  What can fossils teach us? 
  Dinosaurs on Drifting Continents
 Digging up dinosaurs, TED

American paleontologists
1957 births
Living people
University of Chicago faculty
Northern Illinois University alumni
Columbia University alumni
People from Naperville, Illinois
20th-century American scientists
21st-century American scientists